Marius Runkauskas (born May 20, 1986) is a Lithuanian professional basketball player for BC Gargždai-SC of the Lietuvos krepšinio lyga (LKL). He plays primarily at the shooting guard position, but he can also play point guard, if needed.

Early years
Runkauskas played in the Lithuanian Pupils Basketball League (MKL), for the  V. Chomičius basketball school.

Professional career
Runkauskas started his professional basketball career in the Klaipėda, NKL (Lithuanian 2nd Division) team, Nafta-Uni-Laivitė, in 2003. After he became a champion of the NKL, in 2007, with Nafta-Uni-Laivitė, Klaipėda's strongest basketball club invited him to join their team. He averaged 8.8 points, 1.0 assists, and 1.5 rebounds per game. 

The next year, he joined BC Sūduva, and in January 2009, he left the club, and joined the Latvian basketball team ASK Riga. In the following season, he averaged 16.9 points, 3.9 assists, and 3.3 rebounds per game. After the season, he joined UJAP Quimper, playing in the French 2nd Division. With UJAP, he averaged 14.1 points, 1.6 assists, and 2.6 rebounds per game.

In June 2011, he returned to BC Neptūnas, and signed a two-year contract with the team. In July 2014, he moved to Romania, and signed a one-year deal with CSU Asesoft Ploiești. In June 2015, he signed a two-year (1+1) deal with Lietuvos rytas Vilnius.

International career
In 2015, Runkauskas was included into the senior Lithuanian national team extended candidates list, by the team's head coach, Jonas Kazlauskas. He also participated in the Lithuanian national team's training camp, but he was cut from the national team on August 16.

Awards and achievements
Lithuanian 2nd Division Runner-up: (2006)
Lithuanian 2nd Division Champion: (2007)
Eurobasket.com's Baltic BBL League All-Newcomers Team: (2008)
3× Lithuanian LKL League Three-point Shootout Champion: (2008, 2013, 2014)

References

External links
Euroleague.net Profile
Eurobasket.com Profile

1986 births
Living people
ASK Riga players
BC Juventus players
BC Neptūnas players
BC Rytas players
CSU Asesoft Ploiești players
Lithuanian men's basketball players
Point guards
Shooting guards
Basketball players from Klaipėda
UJAP Quimper 29 players